Abdullah Fawaz Afrah Bait Abdulghafur (born on 3 October 1996), is an Omani professional football player who plays as a midfielder for the Omani national team.

International career
He debuted internationally on 10 October 2017 in an 2019 AFC Asian Cup qualification match against the Maldives in a 1–3 victory.

On 9 January 2018, he appeared at the Omani U-23 team to compete at the 2018 AFC U-23 Championship against China in a 3–0 defeat.

On 11 June 2021, Fawaz scored his first two goals for Oman against Afghanistan in a 2022 FIFA World Cup qualifying match in a 1–2 victory.

International goals

References

External links
 
 

1996 births
Living people
Omani footballers
Oman international footballers
Dhofar Club players
Association football midfielders